This is a list of Bienes de Interés Cultural landmarks in the Province of Cádiz, Spain.

References 

 
Cadiz